Ferdian Mahardika Ranialdy (born 20 May 2002) is an Indonesian badminton player.

Achievements

BWF International Challenge/Series (2 titles) 
Men's doubles

  BWF International Challenge tournament
  BWF International Series tournament
  BWF Future Series tournament

BWF Junior International (2 titles, 2 runners-up) 
Boys' doubles

Mixed doubles

  BWF Junior International Grand Prix tournament
  BWF Junior International Challenge tournament
  BWF Junior International Series tournament
  BWF Junior Future Series tournament

Performance timeline

Individual competitions

Junior level  
 Boys' doubles

Senior level

Men's doubles

Mixed doubles

External links

References 

2002 births
Living people
People from Yogyakarta
Indonesian male badminton players
21st-century Indonesian people